In the Mouth of the Wolf is a book by Rose Zar, published in 1983 by The Jewish Publication Society of America. It is a holocaust autobiography published by the author nearly four decades after the end of World War II in Europe. According to the New York Times, Rose Zar is remarkable, in that, unlike many other Jews, who were “sequestered in attics, caves or sewers, Rose Zar survived the Holocaust by hiding in the open.”

Background

Rose Zar (née Ruszka Guterman) was born on July 27, 1922, in Piotrków Trybunalski, Poland to her mother Bela and father Herman Guterman. When Germany invaded Poland on September 1, 1939, Rose was seventeen-years-old. She belonged to the young Labor Zionist organization Hashomer Hatzair and learnt as early as early 1940, from an emissary of the Jewish underground in Warsaw, that the Germans had evil, homicidal intent concerning the Jews of Poland. Her father, Herman had been a deserter from the tsar's army after the Russian Revolution of 1917 and had practical knowledge on how to obtain and survive on fake documents.

Structure

Escape from the Piotrków Ghetto

Her father advised Rose to spare no expense obtain a real passport and Baptismal Certificate. Rose was lucky to obtain these documents belonging to a real person, by the name of Wanda Gajda.

After several false alarms, one evening in October 1942, Rose received a good tip that an 'Action' or liquidation of the Piotrków Ghetto was to take place later that night. Rose and her younger brother Benek left for the railway station immediately, with plans to travel to Ostrowiec, Łódź Voivodeship. However, upon arriving at the small farming community, they were turned away by sympathetic workers, ”Hey! 
Turn around! Don’t go in the city! They’re rounding up all of you Jews!” Rose and Benek were lucky to catch the midnight train to Warsaw, where Rose hoped her underground connections might be of help.

Warsaw and Kraków 

In Warsaw, Rose made contact with the Jewish underground and secured a job for her brother Benek, under an alias, as a barber's apprentice. She also found a job in a leather shop in Rudniki, an hour's train ride from Warsaw. However, after her landlord tried to confiscate her passport, unless she would sleep with him, she fled. Back in Warsaw, her underground contact, Tosia asked her to deliver a message to the Jewish underground in Kraków.

In Kraków station Rose was unlucky enough to be stopped by the secret police. One of the policemen who responded to the scene was from her home town, Piotrków and knew the Gajda family by reputation. By some fast talking, Rose convinced the man that she was indeed Wanda Gajda and she was released. Her underground contact explained that Kraków was the center of German military and civilian government and a temporary residence permit, which was easy to obtain, might allow Rose, under the alias of Wanda Gajda, to work for the German military. Work experience for the German military could eventually lead to permanent residency in Kraków, without further background checks, which would put a fugitive Jew in jeopardy.
Rose applied at the Arbeitsamt, the Central Labor Office and was lucky to find a job as a “stairway janitress” at the German Army Hospital. After a few weeks, Wanda was promoted to the job of nurse's assistant. She found that the doctors, nurses and clerks were German, but most of the patients were Russian or Ukrainian prisoners of War, who were coerced to fight for the Germans. Since Wanda spoke Polish, German and Russian she was popular with the Russian prisoner patients. One ethnic Russian, who was not a prisoner, but a regular member of the Wehrmacht, made persistent romantic overtures to Rose. When Rose rejected him, by throwing hot water in his face, he was able to get her fired.

Working for the SS

On a tip from a neighbor, Rose bounced back and got a job working as a janitress in the kitchen of the Third SS Pioneer Training Battalion in Kraków, but eventually quit, due to baiting by female coworkers, who called her the “Jewish virgin”, because they resented her refinement and refusal to engage in profanity. The Scharführer in charge of civilian workers demoted Wanda to a position cleaning the upper floors of the building. One day, Rose was called upon to clean the SS officers’ canteen. This facility was magnificent, with chandeliers, silver, crystal and fine paintings. Soon after Rose was asked to clean the apartment of Colonel Roemer, the divisional Commander.

In the Mouth of the Wolf

Subsequently, Rose became the live-in maid to SS Colonel Roemer and Mrs Roemer and a nursemaid to their newborn son. Mrs Roemer was pleasantly surprised to find that Rose spoke fluent German, had attended university and was cultured and well read. They became fast friends and had lively discussions which excluded Colonel Roemer. All subordinates of Roemer shouted “Yavohl!”, when he addressed them, which Rose refused to do. To teach Rose a lesson, the Colonel had her locked up in the military brig for three days, but after that period she was released with no long-term consequences. In fact, Colonel Roemer, planned that after Germany won the War, the family would settle on his estate Austria in a house with fine furnishings looted from Jewish homes and Rose would serve as head of the servant staff and a nursemaid to future brothers and sisters of his son Klaus.

Awards and Analysis

‘In the Mouth of the Wolf’ won the Sydney Taylor Book Award, presented by the Association of Jewish Libraries in 1983. The award recognizes outstanding books for children and teens that authentically portray the Jewish experience. Every Jewish holocaust survivor's story is unique and survival often depended on a sequence or confluence of miracles. Rose's story is somewhat different, in that, we get a sense, that she took charge of her own destiny. Her ability to speak Polish and German, without a trace of Yiddish accent, as well as her fluency in Russian, undoubtedly aided her survival. Being part of the Jewish underground in Warsaw gave advance warning of Germany's Final Solution, which reinforced the decision to escape the Piotrków Trybunalski Ghetto. Based on her father's advice, she did not purchase a forgery, but a genuine Passport belonging to another individual, whose identity she assumed. She assiduously avoided romantic entanglements and avoided, when possible the company of other Jews, following the advice of a gentile friend that “One Jew can blend in. Two are always suspect.”

References

Books about the Holocaust
1983 non-fiction books
Personal accounts of the Holocaust
American memoirs